17th London Film Critics Circle Awards
2 March 1997

Film of the Year: 
 Fargo 

British Film of the Year: 
 Secrets & Lies 

The 17th London Film Critics Circle Awards, honouring the best in film for 1996, were announced by the London Film Critics Circle on 2 March 1997.

Winners
Film of the Year
Fargo

British Film of the Year
Secrets & Lies

Foreign Language Film of the Year
Les Misérables • France

Director of the Year
Joel Coen – Fargo

British Director of the Year
Mike Leigh – Secrets & Lies

Screenwriter of the Year
Joel and Ethan Coen – Fargo

British Screenwriter of the Year
Emma Thompson – Sense and Sensibility

Actor of the Year
Morgan Freeman – Seven

Actress of the Year
Frances McDormand – Fargo

British Actor of the Year
Ewan McGregor – Trainspotting, Brassed Off, Emma, The Pillow Book
Ian McKellen – Richard III

British Actress of the Year
Brenda Blethyn – Secrets & Lies

British Newcomer of the Year
Emily Watson – Breaking the Waves

British Producer of the Year
Andrew Macdonald – Trainspotting

Special Achievement Award
Norman Wisdom

Dilys Powell Award
John Mills

Lifetime Achievement Award
Jack Cardiff

External links
IMDB
Official Website

1
1996 film awards
1996 in London
1996 in British cinema